Coombe is a settlement in Gwennap civil parish, Cornwall, England, United Kingdom.

The name 'Komm' in Cornish means 'small valley, dingle'. Compare the Welsh 'cwm'.

References

Hamlets in Cornwall